George Daniel Savu (born 20 March 1983) is a former Romanian footballer who played as a goalkeeper.

Club career
Born in Bucharest, Savu was a Sportul Studențesc youth graduate. In the 2006 summer he joined Dacia Chișinău, being immediately loaned to FC Săcele.

On 28 October 2006 Savu played his first professional match, starting in a 0–1 home loss against CF Brăila for the Liga II championship. He subsequently returned to Dacia in 2007.

Savu moved to Ceahlăul Piatra Neamț in January 2008. He appeared regularly during his first two campaigns, but lost his starting spot in his third, and was loaned to Concordia Chiajna in January 2010, until June.

Savu subsequently returned to Ceahlăul in June, but after making no appearances he moved FC Victoria Brănești in January 2011. On 26 January of the following year he signed for Olt Slatina.

On 21 August 2012 Savu moved abroad for the first time in his career, signing a two-year deal with Spanish Segunda División B side Atlético Sanluqueño CF. On 30 January 2013 he joined fellow league team FC Cartagena.

A backup to new signings Víctor Ibáñez and Jesús Limones, Savu appeared mainly in Copa del Rey matches, notably in a 0–3 loss against FC Barcelona. On 2 August 2014 he moved to Arroyo CP, also in the third level.

Honours
La Unión Atlético
Preferente Autonómica: 2019–20

References

External links

1983 births
Living people
Romanian footballers
Romanian expatriate footballers
Association football goalkeepers
Liga I players
Liga II players
FC Sportul Studențesc București players
FC Dacia Chișinău players
FC Precizia Săcele players
CSM Ceahlăul Piatra Neamț players
CS Concordia Chiajna players
CS Brănești players
FC Olt Slatina players
Atlético Sanluqueño CF players
FC Cartagena footballers
Arroyo CP players
Segunda División B players
Tercera División players
Romanian expatriate sportspeople in Spain
Expatriate footballers in Spain
Footballers from Bucharest